Percocypris pingi is a species of cyprinid in the genus Percocypris. It inhabits Yunnan, China and possibly Laos and Myanmar. Assessed as near threatened on the IUCN Red List, it has a decreasing population. It is used for food both locally and nationally.

References

Cyprinid fish of Asia
Freshwater fish of China
Taxa named by Tchang Tchung-Lin
Fish described in 1930
IUCN Red List near threatened species